"Super Gremlin" is a song by American rapper Kodak Black, released on October 30, 2021, from the Sniper Gang label compilation Sniper Gang Presents Syko Bob & Snapkatt: Nightmare Babies, a Halloween-themed project. It impacted US urban contemporary radio on January 11, 2022, and peaked at number 3 on the Billboard Hot 100. The song is also included on Kodak's fourth studio album, Back for Everything.

Background
The song is taken from Sniper Gang rappers Syko Bob and Snapkatt's album, Sniper Gang Presents Syko Bob & Snapkatt: Nightmare Babies, an 11-track project, of which Kodak appears on eight tracks. HotNewHipHops Aron A. noted how fans praised the song "as return to form" for Kodak.

On December 3, 2021, YouTubers Zias and B. Lou released a video of Kodak joining them for a reaction video of "Super Gremlin". Portions of the video went viral due to Kodak's "peculiar", "odd" behavior. This led to Kodak responding to people accusing him of being on drugs, tweeting "Lol I B Fakin Like I'm Sleepy, Ion B High Guys I Get Drug Tested Consistently".

The vocal sample featured in the beginning and during the choruses is taken from a song called "Errror" by German indie rock band How to Loot Brazil.

Critical reception
Revolt's Jon Powell called the song a standout from Nightmare Babies. In their listing of best hip hop producers of 2021, XXLs Kemet High commended producer ATL Jacob's work during the year, exclaiming: "Most importantly, Jacob helped Kodak Black score his latest hit with 'Super Gremlin', a song that has since erupted more than a bottle of Coca-Cola with a handful of Mentos dropped into it".

Music video
The music video, released on November 1, 2021, is Halloween-themed, combining scenes of Kodak Black driving around with visuals of blood-stained rooms, a padded cell, crime scene tape, and a dominatrix.

Other versions
American rapper Latto released "Super Gremlin Freestyle" on December 27, 2021, which she recorded in her Atlanta studio. It was accompanied by a video.

Charts

Weekly charts

Year-end charts

Certifications

Release history

References

2021 songs
2022 singles
Kodak Black songs
Songs written by Kodak Black
Halloween songs
Diss tracks
Atlantic Records singles
Songs written by ATL Jacob